Rozhnovka , rural localities in Russia, may refer to:

 Rozhnovka, Kursk Oblast, a khutor
 Rozhnovka, Moscow Oblast, a khutor
 Rozhnovka, Yaroslavl Oblast, a village
 Rozhnovka, Voronezh Oblast, a settlement